Pááfang is a Micronesian language of the Federated States of Micronesia. It is spoken on the Hall Islands of Fananu, Murilo, Nomwin, and Ruo in Chuuk State.

References

Languages of the Mariana Islands
Chuukic languages
Endangered Austronesian languages
Severely endangered languages